Imponderables, or Mysteries of Everyday Life Explained, is a series of illustrated reference books by David Feldman written in FAQ format. The series was published by imprints of HarperCollins from 1986 to 1993, Penguin from 1995 to 1996, and HarperCollins from 2004 to 2006.

Premise 
The books examine, investigate, and explain common, yet puzzling phenomena. Examples include: "Why do your eyes hurt when you are tired?", "Why do judges wear black robes?", and "Why do you rarely see purple Christmas lights?", among many others. The word "imponderable" is used to describe such mysteries of everyday life. The books are organized in a FAQ format.

Additional chapters expplore Frustables, defined as Imponderables that are uniquely frustrating because they lack a clear answer. Some of the recurring Frustables are:
 Why do you so often see one shoe lying along the side of the road?
 Why do the English drive on the left and most other countries on the right?
 Why do American women shave their armpits?
 Why do doctors have such messy handwriting?

Volumes 
Not all volumes include a number stamp. From 1986 to 1991, HarperCollins assigned each hardback and paperback edition more than one ISBN.

Revised volumes 
Feldman significantly revised two volumes for HarperCollins in 2004. They were released alongside reprints of other volumes with new titles.

Who Put the Butter in Butterfly? 
In 1989, Feldman explored features of the English language in Who Put the Butter in Butterfly?. It was not published as part of the series by HarperCollins, however the design and formatting is identical to other volumes.

See also 
 The Answer Man – Radio program that ran from 1937 to 1956
 "The Straight Dope" – Newspaper column and companion books published from 1973 to 2018

References

External links 
  (no longer maintained)

Publications established in 1986
Trivia books
Series of books
HarperCollins books